NIKA racing (short for Nicklas Karlsson Racing) is a Swedish racing team, founded by former racing driver Nicklas Karlsson along with Eric Lindgren which currently competes in the World Touring Car Championship. Before that they competed in the Scandinavian Touring Car Championship where they won the teams' championship title in 2011.

Swedish Touring Car Championship

Chevrolet Lacetti (2007–2009)

Karlsson founded the team in 2006 and to run a Chevrolet Lacetti for himself under the Chevrolet Motorsport Sweden banner in Swedish Touring Car Championship in 2007, but started at two races only during the season.

He stepped aside for 2008 to become team manager and the team ran Norwegian Thomas Schie in their car. Schie remained for the most part among the top ten and scored a best result second place in Gothenburg. He finished seventh in the drivers' championship while the team finished fifth in the teams' championship.

Schie continued for the team during the 2009 season, but was forced to leave after six races. What actually was the reason for this is not entirely clear. Schie said that the team was not enough professionally, while Nicklas Karlsson said that was because Schie could not afford to continue. The seat was taken over by Pontus Mörth, who completed the season. He often took a few points in the races, but never came up on the podium. Mörth finished eleven in total, while Schie was fourteenth. In the team championship Chevrolet Motorsport Sweden finished fifth.

Chevrolet Cruze (2010)

Scandinavian Touring Car Championship

Chevrolet Cruze (2011–2012)

World Touring Car Championship

Chevrolet Cruze (2010, 2012–2013)
In 2010 Chevrolet Motorsport Sweden joined the World Touring Car Championship for the 2010 FIA WTCC Race of Italy, running a Chevrolet Cruze LT for TC 2000 Championship driver Leonel Pernía who became the first Argentine to race in the WTCC. The team were not eligible for the Yokohama Team's Trophy as the regulations exclude any teams with the name of a car manufacturer from inclusion in the trophy. Pernía finished eighteenth in race one after an excursion through the gravel trap at the Parabolica but he scored a single point in race two when he finished tenth.

The team returned to the championship in 2012, entering a Chevrolet Cruze 1.6T for Rickard Rydell at the season opening 2012 FIA WTCC Race of Italy. Rydell lined up fifth in qualifying and finished both races in the points, including fourth place and a fastest lap in race one.

The team running as NIKA Racing will return to the WTCC in 2013 for the full season with a single Chevrolet Cruze 1.6T. They signed Michel Nykjær to drive for them having finished third in the 2012 Scandinavian Touring Car Championship season with the team. However Nykjær left the team before the end of the season and was replaced by Hiroki Yoshimoto in Japan, Rickard Rydell in China and Yukinori Taniguchi in Macau respectively.

Honda Civic (2014-2015)
In 2014 NIKA Racing announced that they will compete in the TC2 category with Yukinori Taniguchi driving Honda Civic The team ultimately appeareded only in Hungary.

For the 2015 season the team will upgrade to TC1-spec Honda Civic WTCC, built by JAS Motorsport. Rickard Rydell will return to the series full-time with the team.

Chevrolet Cruze (2016-)
For 2016 season the team sold the Honda Civic to Zengő Motorsport to compete with a Chevrolet Cruze and the driver John Bryant-Meisner.

Results

World Touring Car Championship

References

2006 establishments in Sweden
Swedish auto racing teams
World Touring Car Championship teams
Auto racing teams established in 2006